The Tenth Canadian Ministry was the second cabinet chaired by Prime Minister Sir Robert Borden.  It governed Canada from 12 October 1917 to 10 July 1920, including most of the 13th Canadian Parliament.  The government was formed by the Unionists, a war-time coalition between the old Conservative Party of Canada and some members of the Liberal Party of Canada.  Borden was also Prime Minister in the Ninth Canadian Ministry.

Ministers 
Prime Minister
12 October 1917 – 10 July 1920: Sir Robert Borden
Minister of Agriculture
12 October 1917 – 18 June 1919: Thomas Crerar
18 June 1919 – 12 August 1919: James Alexander Calder (acting)
12 August 1919 – 10 July 1920: Simon Fraser Tolmie
Minister of Aviation
12 October 1917 – 10 July 1920: Albert Edward Kemp
Minister of Customs
12 October 1917 – 18 May 1918: Arthur Lewis Sifton
Minister of Customs and Inland Revenue
18 May 1918 – 2 September 1919: Arthur Lewis Sifton
2 September 1919 – 31 December 1919: John Dowsley Reid (acting)
31 December 1919 – 10 July 1920: Martin Burrell
Secretary of State for External Affairs
12 October 1917 – 10 July 1920: Sir Robert Borden
Minister of Finance
12 October 1917 – 2 August 1919: Sir William Thomas White
2 August 1919 – 10 July 1920: Sir Henry Lumley Drayton
Receiver General of Canada
12 October 1917 – 10 July 1920: The Minister of Finance (Ex officio)
12 October 1917 – 2 August 1919: William Thomas White
2 August 1919 – 10 July 1920: Henry Lumley Drayton
Minister presiding over the Department of Health
6 June 1919 – 10 July 1920: Newton Rowell
Minister of Immigration and Colonization
12 October 1917 – 10 July 1920: James Alexander Calder
Superintendent-General of Indian Affairs
12 October 1917 – 10 July 1920: The Minister of the Interior (Ex officio)
12 October 1917 – 10 July 1920: Arthur Meighen
Minister of Inland Revenue
12 October 1917 – 1 April 1918: Albert Sévigny
1 April 1918 – 14 May 1918: Vacant (Joseph Ulric Vincent was acting)
14 May 1918 – 18 May 1918: Arthur Lewis Sifton
Minister of the Interior
12 October 1917 – 10 July 1920: Arthur Meighen
Minister of Justice
12 October 1917 – 10 July 1920: Charles Doherty
Attorney General of Canada
12 October 1917 – 10 July 1920: The Minister of Justice (Ex officio)
12 October 1917 – 10 July 1920: Charles Doherty
Minister of Labour 
12 October 1917 – 8 November 1918: Thomas Wilson Crothers
8 November 1918 – 10 July 1920: Gideon Robertson
Leader of the Government in the Senate
12 October 1917 – 10 July 1920: Sir James Alexander Lougheed
Minister of Marine and Fisheries
12 October 1917 – 13 October 1917: Vacant (Alexander Johnston was acting)
13 October 1917 – 10 July 1920: Charles Ballantyne
Minister of Militia and Defence 
12 October 1917 – 16 January 1920: Sydney Chilton Mewburn
16 January 1920 – 24 January 1920: James Alexander Calder (acting)
24 January 1920 – 10 July 1920: Hugh Guthrie
Minister of Mines
12 October 1917 – 31 December 1919: Martin Burrell
31 December 1919 – 10 July 1920: Arthur Meighen
Minister of the Naval Service 
12 October 1917 – 13 October 1917: Vacant (George Joseph Desbarats was acting)
13 October 1917 – 10 July 1920: Charles Ballantyne
Minister of Overseas Military Forces
12 October 1917 – 1 July 1920: Sir Albert Edward Kemp
Postmaster General
12 October 1917 – 10 July 1920: Pierre-Édouard Blondin
President of the Privy Council
12 October 1917 – 10 July 1920: Newton Rowell
Minister of Public Works
12 October 1917 – 13 October 1917: Charles Ballantyne
13 October 1917 – 6 August 1919: Frank Broadstreet Carvell
6 August 1919 – 3 September 1919: John Dowsley Reid (acting)
3 September 1919 – 31 December 1919: Arthur Lewis Sifton
31 December 1919 – 10 July 1920: John Dowsley Reid (acting)
Minister of Railways and Canals 
12 October 1917 – 1 July 1920: John Dowsley Reid
Secretary of State of Canada
12 October 1917 – 31 December 1919: Martin Burrell
31 December 1919 – 10 July 1920: Arthur Lewis Sifton
Registrar General of Canada
12 October 1917 – 10 July 1920: The Secretary of State of Canada (Ex officio)
12 October 1917 – 31 December 1919: Martin Burrell
31 December 1919 – 10 July 1920: Arthur Lewis Sifton
Minister of Soldiers' Civil Re-establishment
21 February 1918 – 10 July 1920: Sir James Alexander Lougheed
Solicitor General of Canada
5 July 1919 – 10 July 1920: Hugh Guthrie
Minister of Trade and Commerce
12 October 1917 – 10 July 1920: Sir George Eulas Foster
Minister without Portfolio 
12 October 1917 – 22 September 1919: Francis Cochrane
12 October 1917 – 21 February 1918: Sir James Alexander Lougheed
23 October 1917 – 25 February 1920: Alexander Kenneth Maclean
23 October 1917 – 8 November 1918: Gideon Robertson

Offices not of the Cabinet
Parliamentary Undersecretary of State for External Affairs
12 October 1917 – 7 November 1918: Hugh Clark
7 November 1918 – 10 July 1920: Francis Henry Keefer

Parliamentary Secretary of Militia and Defence
12 October 1917 – 23 February 1918: Fleming Blanchard McCurdy
23 February 1918 – 7 November 1918: Vacant
7 November 1918 – 10 July 1920: Hugh Clark

Parliamentary Secretary of Soldiers' Civil Re-establishment
21 February 1918 – 23 February 1918: Vacant
23 February 1918 – 7 November 1918: Fleming Blanchard McCurdy
7 November 1918 – 10 July 1920: Vacant

Solicitor General of Canada
12 October 1917 – 5 July 1919: Hugh Guthrie

References

Succession

10
1917 establishments in Canada
1920 disestablishments in Canada
Cabinets established in 1917
Cabinets disestablished in 1920
Ministries of George V